Codrescu is a Romanian surname. Notable people with the surname include:

 Andrei Codrescu (born 1946), Romanian-born American poet, novelist, essayist, screenwriter, and commentator
 Constantin Codrescu (1931–2022), Romanian actor

Romanian-language surnames